Qasımbəyli or Qasimbəyli and Qasımbeyli or Kasymbeyli or Kasumbegly or Kasumbeyli may refer to:
Qasımbəyli, Agdam, Azerbaijan
Qasımbəyli, Agsu, Azerbaijan
Qasımbəyli, Barda, Azerbaijan
Qasımbəyli, Goranboy, Azerbaijan
Qasımbəyli, Jalilabad, Azerbaijan
Qasımbəyli, Sabirabad, Azerbaijan